Jugnu is a 1973 Indian Hindi-language action film produced and directed by Pramod Chakravorty. The story is about an extremely intelligent crook with a "Golden" heart (Dharmendra), who has the remarkable ability to steal from the most protected setups. The movie also stars Hema Malini, Lalita Pawar, Mehmood, Prem Chopra, Nazir Hussain, Ajit and Pran. The music is by S. D. Burman and the lyrics by Anand Bakshi. The film features a popular dialogue written by Sachin Bhowmick, "Baap ke naam kaa sahara kamzor log lete hai", Meaning: "The weak seek to be known by their father's reputation", which was said on two occasions by Dharmendra and Pran. It went on to become one of the most loved and famous dialogues of all time in Hindi cinema. Jugnu Remains a cult classic of Hindi cinema and represents one of Dharmendra's finest performances. This film was remade into Tamil and Telugu in 1980 as Guru.

Cast

Soundtrack
The music of the film was composed by S. D. Burman.

Track listing

References

External links 
 

1973 films
1970s Hindi-language films
Indian action films
Films scored by S. D. Burman
Hindi films remade in other languages
Films directed by Pramod Chakravorty
1973 action films